Commonwealth Bay is an open bay about 48 km (30 mi) wide at the entrance between Point Alden and Cape Gray in Antarctica. It was discovered in 1912 by the Australasian Antarctic Expedition under Douglas Mawson, who established the main base of the expedition at Cape Denison at the head of the bay. Named by Australasian Antarctic Expedition after the Commonwealth of Australia.

Katabatic Wind

Storms are caused by katabatic wind, a concentrated flow of cold air moving along the steep surface of the ice shield towards the sea.  The air flow is accelerated by the increasing gradient of the surface of ice and the cliff monolith at Cape Denison. In the summer there are periods of relative calm but during winter storms are especially strong and long lasting, and can start and end unexpectedly. An abrupt start and end of storm might be accompanied by powerful whirlpools and expressive short-lived and fast-moving clouds at the coast line.

Despite the extreme weather, the coast of Commonwealth Bay is an important breeding area for Antarctic petrels, emperor penguins, and Adelie penguins which means that there are also Leopard seals.

Adelie penguin population crash
The population of a colony of Adelie penguins here has crashed from 160,000 to 10,000, since 2011. A giant iceberg the size of Rome got stuck, and the colony is now effectively landlocked.

References

External links
Life On Commonwealth Bay by Reuters journalist Pauline Askin
Commonwealth Bay photographs on Flickr

Bays of George V Land
Extreme points of Earth